Between Wine and Blood is a mixed studio and live album by British rock band New Model Army, released on 5 September 2014 by Attack Attack Records.  It comprises six new studio tracks and live versions of eleven tracks from the previous year's album Between Dog and Wolf.

Track listing
All tracks written by New Model Army

Studio tracks
"According to You" – 3:52 
"Angry Planet" – 5:25
"Guessing" – 3:30
"Happy to Be Here" – 6:02
"Devil's Bargain" – 5:29
"Sunrise" – 4:58

Live tracks
"Stormclouds" – 4:11
"March in September" – 4:33
"Did You Make It Safe?" – 3:43
"I Need More Time" – 5:08
"Pull the Sun" – 5:26
"Lean Back and Fall" – 5:09
"Seven Times" – 3:48
"Between Dog and Wolf" – 6:04
"Summer Moors" – 5:13
"Knievel" – 3:29
"Horsemen" – 4:47

Personnel

New Model Army
Justin Sullivan – vocals, guitar
Ceri Monger – bass, percussion, backing vocals, dulcimer
Michael Dean – drums, percussion, backing vocals
Dean White – keyboards, guitar, backing vocals, percussion
Marshall Gill – guitar, backing vocals

Additional musicians
Ed Alleyne-Johnson – violin
Tobias Unterberg – cello
Stuart Eastham – bass (bowed)

Production
Justin Sullivan – producer
Michael Dean – producer
Joe Barresi – mixing

Chart performance

References

External links
Official NMA website

New Model Army (band) albums
2014 albums